Paige Scott is an Australian rules footballer playing for the Essendon Football Club in the AFL Women's (AFLW). Scott was recruited by Essendon with the eighth pick in the 2022 AFL Women's draft.

AFL Women's career
Scott debuted for the Bombers in the opening round of season seven, playing in Essendon's inaugural AFL Women's team. On debut, Scott collected 16 disposals and a goal, earning a nomination for the AFL Women's season seven Rising Star award.

Statistics
Updated to the end of round 9, S7 (2022).

|-
| S7 (2022) ||  || 32
| 9 || 7 || 5 || 55 || 30 || 85 || 21 || 21 || 0.8 || 0.6 || 6.1 || 3.3 || 9.4 || 2.3 || 2.3 || 
|- class=sortbottom
! colspan=3 | Career
! 9 !! 7 !! 5 !! 55 !! 30 !! 85 !! 21 !! 21 !! 0.8 !! 0.6 !! 6.1 !! 3.3 !! 9.4 !! 2.3 !! 2.3 !!
|}

Honours and achievements
 Essendon equal games record holder
 Essendon goalkicking record holder
 AFL Women's Rising Star nominee: S7

References

External links
 
 Paige Scott at AustralianFootball.com
 

2004 births
Living people
Essendon Football Club (AFLW) players
Greater Western Victoria Rebels players (NAB League Girls)
Australian rules footballers from Victoria (Australia)